Bharthana is a town and a municipal board in Etawah district  in the state of Uttar Pradesh, India. It has an average elevation of 135 metres (442 feet).

Demographics 
 India census, Bharthana had a population of 150000. Males constitute 52% of the population and females 48%. Bharthana has an average literacy rate of 72%, higher than the national average of 59.5%; with male literacy of 77% and female literacy of 66%. 15% of the population is under 6 years of age.

References 

Cities and towns in Etawah district